Mahashakti is a mini-series, which was made for television and aired on DD Metro in 1995. It stars Aditya Pancholi and Juhi Chawla.

Plot

Sanjay is the son of a wealthy businessman, he has everything that a guy could dream of, but his life is not easy as everyone thinks. From his childhood, Sanjay keep seeing dreams and visions that disturbs him and the name of a girl Kanchan keeps haunts him. His family thinks that Sanjay has some mental problems, but the truth is that Sanjay is not imagining these things. His search for his answers lead him to a village, where he found out the truth of his visions.

Cast

Aditya Pancholi as Sanjay
Juhi Chawla as Kanchan
Alok Nath
Sonu Walia as Jyoti 
Prem Chopra as sardiman
Gulshan Grover

References 

1990s Indian television miniseries
1995 Indian television series debuts
DD Metro original programming